Anna Borkowska (died 2008, in Tehran) was a Polish war refugee who settled in Iran. She was an actress and vocal teacher. As a child, after the Soviet invasion of Poland she was forced to leave home with some of her family members and transported to a forced labor camp in Siberia in the Soviet Union. She was one of the 120,000 Polish refugees who fled the Soviet Union with Anders' Army after the Axis invasion in 1941. She settled in Tehran.

Borkowska is best known to international audiences for her role as the kindly elderly woman who aids a determined little girl in the quest for the perfect goldfish in Jafar Panahi's 1995 film The White Balloon.

Borkowska is also the main character of Khosrow Sinai's The Lost Requiem (original title: , مرثیه گمشده, released in 1983),  which is a documentary about the Poles who found refuge in Iran during World War II, after being forcibly taken to Soviet labor camps in Siberia.

Borkowska is buried in the Polish cemetery at Doulab in Tehran.

Legacy

A lecture on Borkowska, on her youth in Poland, the hardships in Soviet slavery, and her life and film career in Iran was delivered by Polish specialist in Iranian studies Ivonna Nowicka in June 2019 in Warsaw
 and in September 2019 in Vinnytsia, Ukraine. Written and photographic and unique film material from the archives of Nowicka and of researcher Alireza Doulatshahi was used. The lecture in Warsaw is available on Youtube.

References

External links
 

20th-century Iranian actresses
Polish emigrants to Iran
Polish actresses
Polish refugees
Burials in Iran
2008 deaths
Burials at Doulab Cemetery
1916 births